Mountain View College (or MVC) is a private, co-educational, Seventh-day Adventist college in Valencia, Bukidnon, Philippines which was established in 1949. It was the second Adventist college to be established in the Philippines and the first in Mindanao. It is a part of the Seventh-day Adventist education system, the world's second largest Christian school system.

As of 2015, it had a total semestral enrollment of 1,716. These students are primarily from Mindanao, although there are quite a number from Luzon and the Visayas.  International enrollment from Asia, Africa, Europe, and North America comprises about five percent of the total student population.

History
MVC was founded by Andrew Nathaniel Nelson primarily in response to the growing interest in Christian education within the Philippines.
A 584% increase for a six-year period in the college enrollment of Philippine Union College when he was then president,
magnified the problems associated with the less-than-ideal location of the campus, leading him to the formulation of nine-point criteria for the location of
an Adventist college. They were founded on Adventist principles and prior experience (involvement in the founding of Seattle Junior Academy in 1915 and the relocation of Japan Missionary College in 1926).

Although Nelson's criteria were perceived as too idealistic by some of his colleagues, he was determined to find such a site. His search focused on the island of Mindanao, since part of the criteria involved the incidence of typhoons, which was a rare occurrence in that island. The campus of Mindanao Mission Academy, situated in Manticao, Misamis Oriental, served as MVC's temporary campus from 1949 to 1952, while the search was on for a site that met the criteria. It was then known as Philippine Union College Mindanao.

Nelson and his team arrived at MVC's current site in 1950. Negotiations for the purchase of property were then started. After the purchase, initial structures were set up.
In 1952, the name "Mountain View College" was chosen from a list that included "Philippine Missionary College" and "Oriental Missionary College". In 1953, classes officially started at the new location.
MVC's first offerings were certificates or associate degrees in business, education, and religion. It held its first graduation exercises in 1957.

As of 2009, the college has 132 full-time and part-time teaching faculty members and 73 staff members in the industrial and support service departments.

Gentilic
The Gentilic "MVCian" has been used for many years by MVC alumni. Students only use it when they are off-campus. Its use is more informal than official.

Campuses

The main campus is located on a  plateau in Mt. Nebo, Valencia City, with an area of 10.24 km², which includes farmlands, forests, and ranch lands ideal for industry work. The land has an ample supply of water that allows MVC to have its own hydroelectric plants, providing the campus populace with enough electricity along with an abundant water supply for the homes and other college facilities. It is situated between the Kitanglad and Kalatungan mountain ranges and bordered on the north by the Manupali River and on the south by the Anasag and Malingon creeks.

An annex campus is located in Bagontaas, Valencia City, which is occupied by the School of Nursing. It includes a solarium, dormitories, classrooms, offices, and a cafeteria.

Villages
The faculty homes within the main campus are clustered into villages. These villages are often referred to as barangays, although not in the same sense as barangay, the smallest political administrative division used by the national government. Some village names are derived from the road or drive passing through it. The residence buildings originally sported the ubiquitous white coloring with green trimmings.

On the southwest corner of the campus is Malingon Drive. Prior to that, it was called Jamandre Drive, which was once split into two: Malingon Drive(in the northern end) and Bougainvilla Beauty (in the southern end). On the western edge of the campus is Ranch Drive, although the road is named M.O. Abesta Avenue. On the northwest corner is Pioneers' Drive, which used to be Loggers' Village. Between Ranch Drive and Pioneers' Drive is a scatter of homes collectively known as Engineering Drive. On the southern edge is Barangay Uno, which was also called Elementary Drive and Section Two. Part of Barangay Uno is the Korean Village, where most houses were once occupied by Korean students. On the eastern-southeastern corner is Pines Drive, which used to be Section One, or the American Homes, where American missionaries were housed during the early years of MVC.

Guesthouses
There are currently four guesthouses on campus: the Jubilee Guesthouse, which is adjacent to the Jubilee Park; the Pioneer Guesthouse, which is adjacent to the Hilltop Minimart; The Pallasa Hall, located also in the Jubilee Park and occasionally used for the practicum of TLE students; and the Alumni Church Guesthouse, located behind the church building.

Student life
The student body of MVC is represented by the Central Student Council which elects its officers every school year.
Each of the seven schools has its own local council which elects its officers every semester.
About 80% of the students are housed in two ladies' dormitories, two men's dormitories and a married-student dormitory.
The rest either stay with the faculty or commute from the nearby sitios, barangays, or municipalities.

A typical student's extra-curricular time is spent in the group activities of the organizations that the student belongs to. Given the country setting of MVC, the most common activities are camping and outreach. Smaller-sized organizations tend to have a more close-knit group of members. On the other hand, relationships between members and non-members vary from simple face-recognition to the intimate, as inter-group dating is frowned upon.

Student organizations
MVC is home to a number of student organizations. Included here are the current and defunct organizations:

The political organizations include Central Student Council, School of Agriculture Student Council, School of Arts and Sciences Student Council, School of Business and Accountancy Student Council, School of Computing Student Council, School of Education Student Council, School of Nursing Student Council, and School of Theology Student Council. Inter-school organizations include: ANAK, OP, and PE.

Academic organizations include Circle of English Majors, Lambda Sigma, Mu Sigma Kappa, Society of Agricultural Majors, Society of Electrical Technologists, Teachers of Tomorrow – Ethyl Young Chapter, Teachers of Tomorrow – Urbano Oliva Chapter, Young Ellen's Club, Young Theologians Club.

The singing groups include the Advent Philomels, Alauda Arvensis, Hilltop Chorale, Singing Ambassadors, Sons and Daughters, Thrushes Ministrants, Goldenaires. There are also other musical groups, such as: Hilltop Symphonic Band and His Instruments.

Cultural organizations include: Adventist Muslim Relations, International Students Association, area specific organizations, such as: Association of DAvao Mission Students (ADAMS); and the alumni organizations of the Adventist academies in Mindanao and the Visayas. Service, outreach, and ministerial organizations include: Hilltop Amateur Radio Team (HART), LIGHT, Master Guides, Ministerial Seminar, Peer Counselors, Regeneration, Rescue 741, Seekers for Truth, Student Association of Literature Evangelists (SALE), and SULADS. Miscellaneous organizations are: EARTH Society, Advent Explorers, and the Reach-out Gymnaires.

Fraternities and sororities are not allowed on campus.

Student media
Also featured at MVC are a number of student publications, both current and defunct: BEAMS, Dots and Dashes, Hilltop Flashes, Hilltop Slashes, Non-Linear Points, The Orchid, Outreach, Newsprint, Pencil, The Sentry, and The Views. Students also man the campus AM station, DXCR.

In-campus accessibility
The different buildings within the campus are within walking distance from each other. They are often connected with covered concrete walkways. Prior to the fire of 1991 that damaged the administration building and some classrooms, elevated wooden ramps connected the main buildings.

Vehicular access is also provided either through graveled or concreted, one-lane or two-lane roads. Access to more distant locations are usually via dirt roads that are only occasionally graveled.

Off-campus accessibility
The main campus is accessible by public utility jeeps that regularly travel to and from Poblacion, Valencia City.

Students residing in the dormitories have limited off-campus access. Only commuting students compose the bulk of passengers traveling to and from the campus on a daily basis.

Connectivity
A fiber-optic backbone links the main buildings and offices. Some locations on the main campus also provide free public wifi. Students pay a one-time fee and have unlimited access throughout the entire semester. However, some students still opt to access the internet through any of the locally available service providers due to speed and filtering issues.

Despite having two hydroelectric plants, the power supply remains unstable at times, making uninterruptible internet access impossible.

Sports and recreation
The main campus includes a football field, which is also utilized for track and field events, two indoor tennis courts, one outdoor and two indoor basketball courts, one outdoor volleyball court, a softball field, two swimming pools, and an auditorium, for other indoor sports activities.

The roads, paths, and walkways crisscrossing the entire campus make it conducive for jogging, brisk walking, or running. The Manupali River, north of the campus, and the Malingon River, south of the campus, where the Malingon Falls is also located, have some locations suitable for white water rafting. The rock cliffs bordering the Manupali River may provide some possible venue for rock climbing.

The Nelson Hill, east of the campus, and the Telescope Hill, west of the campus, and the generally varied topographical terrain surrounding the campus also makes it suitable for hiking and horseback riding, and possibly ATVs. Being a bird sanctuary makes it also appropriate for bird watching.

A number of locations suitable for camping dot the area in and around the campus: multiple spots along the Manupali; a clearing adjacent to the Malingon Falls; a reforested area known as the Millennium Park; the grounds of the elementary school; a forested area known as Sleepy Hollow; the reservoir grounds; and many others.

Located within a few kilometers of Mount Musuan, an active volcano, Mount Kalatungan, a potentially-active volcano, and Mount Kitanglad, an inactive volcano, the campus has many students who count mountaineering as among their hobbies.

Given the number of waterfalls located close to the campus, falls-hopping is also considered a recreational activity. The Malingon Falls and the Twin Falls are both located within the MVC property. The neighboring barangay of Lilingayon to the west of the campus also has its Alamay Falls and Kimatahay Falls.

Outreach
Most students are active in religious, livelihood, and health outreach to the neighboring sitios and barangays. These locations are often accessible via mountain trails, and sometimes require wading waist-deep across icy-cold creeks and rivers.

Courses offered

Graduate school
 Master of Arts in English
 Master in Management

School of Agriculture
Two-Year Certificate in Agricultural Science
Bachelor of Science in Agriculture, majors in
Animal Science
Crop Science

School of Arts and Sciences
Bachelor of Arts in English 
Bachelor of Science in Biology

School of Business and Accountancy
Associate in Office Administration
Bachelor of Science in Accountancy
Bachelor of Science in Accounting Information System
Bachelor of Science in Business Administration, majors in
Financial Management
Human Resource Development Management
Bachelor of Science in Office Administration

School of Computing
Bachelor of Science in Information Technology

School of Education
Bachelor of Elementary Education
Bachelor of Secondary Education, majors in
English
Mathematics
Sciences
Bachelor of Physical Education major in
School Physical Education

School of Medical Technology
Bachelor of Science in Medical Technology

School of Nursing
Bachelor of Science in Nursing

School of Theology
Bachelor of Arts in Theology

Technical/Vocational Education
Automotive Servicing NC I and NC II

Basic Education
Senior High School with the following tracks:
Academic—Accountancy, Business and Management (ABM); Humanities and Social Sciences (HUMSS); General Academics (GA); Science, Technology, Engineering and Mathematics (STEM)
Technical/Vocational—Industrial Arts: Automotive Servicing; Home Economics: Caregiving, Health Care Services, Bread and Pastry Production, Cookery
Arts and Design—Performing Arts: Music
Sports—Badminton, Basketball, Football, Swimming, Tennis
Junior High School
Elementary
Kindergarten 2
Kindergarten 1

List of presidents

See also

 List of Seventh-day Adventist colleges and universities
 Seventh-day Adventist education

References

External links

MVC Alumni Website
MVC old website

Universities and colleges in Bukidnon
Universities and colleges affiliated with the Seventh-day Adventist Church
Adventist universities and colleges in the Philippines
Education in Valencia, Bukidnon
Educational institutions established in 1953
1953 establishments in the Philippines